Sääse was a former small borough in Tapa Parish, Lääne-Viru County in northern Estonia., now part of Tamsalu.

References

External links 
Satellite map at Maplandia.com

Boroughs and small boroughs in Estonia